Harpers Ferry is a historic town in Jefferson County, West Virginia. It is located in the lower Shenandoah Valley. The population was 285 at the 2020 census. Situated at the confluence of the Potomac and Shenandoah rivers, where the U.S. states of Maryland, Virginia, and West Virginia meet, it is the easternmost town in West Virginia. During the American Civil War, it was the northernmost point of Confederate-controlled territory. An 1890 history book on the town called it "the best strategic point in the whole South."

The town was formerly spelled Harper's Ferry with an apostrophe, so named because in the 18th century it was the site of a ferry service owned and operated by Robert Harper. The United States Board on Geographic Names, whose Domestic Name Committee is reluctant to include apostrophes in official place names, established the standard spelling of "Harpers Ferry" by 1891.

By far, the most important event in the town's history was John Brown's raid on the Harpers Ferry Armory in 1859.

Prior to the American Civil War, Harpers Ferry was a manufacturing town as well as a major transportation hub. The main economic activity in the town in the 20th and 21st centuries is tourism. John Brown's Fort is the most visited tourist site in the state of West Virginia. The headquarters of the Appalachian Trail are there—not the midpoint, but close to it, and easily accessible—and the buildings of the former Storer College are used by the National Park Service for one of its four national training centers. The National Park Service is Harpers Ferry's largest employer in the 21st century.

The lower town has been reconstructed by the National Park Service. It was in ruins by the end of the American Civil War, not helped by later river flooding. "The fact that Harpers Ferry was first and foremost an industrial village during the 19th century is not apparent in the sights, sounds, or smells of the town today."

Geography

The geographical and physical features of Harpers Ferry were the principal reasons for its settlement and eventual industrial development. It is a natural transportation hub and a major river, the Shenandoah, joins the Potomac River at Harpers Ferry. It guarded the entrance to Virginia's large Shenandoah Valley, and the Potomac provided easy access to Washington. The valleys of the rivers made it possible to build the never-completed Chesapeake and Ohio Canal, then the Baltimore and Ohio Railroad, and shortly after that the Winchester and Potomac Railroad. The first railroad junction in the United States was at Harpers Ferry. Essential telegraph lines passed through the town.

The armory, and later other industries, were located in Harpers Ferry because of the abundant water power available from the rivers.

The ferry ended in 1824, when a covered wooden road bridge by the name of Wager's Bridge was built. Harpers Ferry was  the site of the first and for many years the only railroad bridge across the Potomac River, the Baltimore & Ohio Railroad's bridge, built in 1836–37. None of Washington, D.C.'s bridges connecting it with Virginia carried more than horse traffic until after the American Civil War. In 1851, a second bridge was built, across the Shenandoah, one of the earliest Bollman trusses. A newer Bollman truss bridge, which carried both rail and highway traffic, opened in 1870 but was washed away in a flood in 1936.

The town's original lower section is on a flood plain created by the two rivers. It is surrounded by higher ground, and since the 20th century has been part of Harpers Ferry National Historical Park. Most of the remainder, which includes the more elevated populated area, is included in the separate Harpers Ferry Historic District. Two other National Register of Historic Places properties adjoin the town: the B & O Railroad Potomac River Crossing and St. Peter's Roman Catholic Church.

The Appalachian Trail Conservancy (ATC) headquarters is in Harpers Ferry. The Appalachian Trail passes directly through town, which some consider the psychological midpoint of the trail although the exact physical midpoint is farther north, in Pennsylvania. Uniquely, the towns of Harpers Ferry and adjoining Bolivar Heights partnered with the ATC to be declared a united Appalachian Trail Community. Other popular outdoor activities in the area include white water rafting, fishing, mountain biking, tubing, canoeing, hiking, zip lining, and rock climbing.

History

18th century
In 1733,  Peter Stephens, a squatter, settled on land near The Point, the area where the Potomac and Shenandoah Rivers meet, and established a ferry from Virginia (now West Virginia) to Maryland, across the Potomac River.

Robert Harper

Robert Harper, from whom the town takes its name, was born in 1718 in Oxford Township near Philadelphia, Pennsylvania. Since he was a builder, Harper was asked by a group of Quakers in 1747 to build a meeting house in the Shenandoah Valley near the present site of Winchester, Virginia. Traveling through Maryland on his way to the Shenandoah Valley, Harper—who was also a millwright—realized the potential of the latent waterpower from the Shenandoah and Potomac Rivers at an easily accessible location. He paid Stephens 30 guineas for his squatting rights to the ferry, since the land actually belonged to Lord Fairfax.

Harper then purchased  of land from Lord Fairfax in 1751. In 1761, the Virginia General Assembly granted him the right to establish and maintain a ferry across the Potomac, even though a ferry had already been functioning since before Harper arrived. In 1763, the Virginia General Assembly established the town of "Shenandoah Falls at Mr. Harpers Ferry." Harper died in October 1782 and is buried in the Harper Cemetery.

Thomas Jefferson
 
On October 25, 1783, Thomas Jefferson visited Harpers Ferry as he was traveling to Philadelphia and passed through Harpers Ferry with his daughter Patsy. Viewing "the passage of the Potomac through the Blue Ridge" from a rock that is now named for him as Jefferson's Rock, he called the site "perhaps one of the most stupendous scenes in nature" and stated, "This scene is worth a voyage across the Atlantic." The town was one of his favorite retreats, and tradition says that much of his Notes on the State of Virginia was written there. Jefferson County, in which Harpers Ferry is located was named for him on its creation in 1801.

George Washington
George Washington, as president of the Patowmack Company, which was formed to complete river improvements on the Potomac River and its tributaries, traveled to Harpers Ferry during summer 1785 to determine the need for bypass canals. Following Washington's familiarity with the area led him to propose the site in 1794 for a new U.S. armory and arsenal, some of his family moved to the area. His brother Charles Washington, who founded the nearby Jefferson County, West Virginia town of Charles Town, and his great-great-nephew, Colonel Lewis Washington, who was held hostage during John Brown's raid in 1859, both moved to the area.

19th century

The federal armory

In 1796, the federal government purchased a  parcel of land from the heirs of Robert Harper. Construction began on what would become the United States Armory and Arsenal at Harpers Ferry in 1799. It is referred to locally as both "the armory" and "the arsenal," but it is the same facility. This was the second of only two such facilities in the United States, the first being in Springfield, Massachusetts. Together they produced most of the small arms for the U.S. Army. The town was transformed into a water-powered industrial center. Between 1801 and 1861, when the armory was destroyed to prevent capture during the American Civil War, it produced more than 600,000 muskets, rifles, and pistols. Inventor Captain John H. Hall pioneered the use of interchangeable parts in firearms manufactured at his rifle works at the armory between 1820 and 1840. His M1819 Hall rifle was the first breech-loading weapon adopted by the U.S. Army.

Canals

Harpers Ferry's first man-made transportation facility was the Potomac Canal. The canal ceased transportation in 1828, but a portion of it in front of the town channeled river water to run machinery for the armory.

The Potomac Canal ran on the Virginia side of the river. On the Maryland side, the later Chesapeake and Ohio Canal and the Baltimore and Ohio Railroad competed for right-of-way on a very narrow patch of land downstream from Harpers Ferry.

Arrival of railroads
Industrialization continued in 1833 when the Chesapeake & Ohio Canal reached Harpers Ferry, linking it with Washington, D.C. on the canal's western expansion to Ohio  that was never completed. A year later, after a protracted dispute with the Baltimore & Ohio Railroad began service from Harpers Ferry via Wager Bridge, named for the same family that later built the Wager Hotel across from Harpers Ferry's train station. The bridge connected the town across the Potomac with Sandy Hook, Maryland, which for a few years in the 1830s was the railroad's western terminus. In 1837, the railroad crossed the Potomac into Harpers Ferry with the opening of the B & O Railroad Potomac River Crossing.

The first railroad junction in the country began service in 1836 when the Winchester and Potomac Railroad opened its line from Harpers Ferry southwest to Charles Town and then to Winchester, Virginia.

Virginius Island

Virginius Island connected the Shenandoah River to the lower part of Harpers Ferry and was created by happenstance in the early 1800s after debris floated down from upstream mills during the construction of the Shenandoah Canal. Cotton, flour mills, and other water-powered companies were developed on Virginius Island, taking advantage of the Shenandoah River’s water power and good routes to markets. The island came to house all of Harpers Ferry's manufacturing except for the armory—which, although it used the Potomac River for power—also built a rifle plant some distance upstream using the Shenandoah's power.

Virginius Island also provided working-class housing at a boarding house and in row houses. At the island’s population height just prior to the American Civil War, there were some 180 residents. Although no intact structure survives because 20th-century floods destroyed everything, many visitors are attracted to view Virginius Island's historic ruins as well as walk National Park Service trails.

John Brown's raid

On October 16, 1859, the abolitionist John Brown led a group of 22 men (counting himself) in a raid on the armory. Five of the men were black: three free black men, one freed slave, and one fugitive slave. Brown attacked and captured several buildings, hoping to secure the weapons depot and arm the slaves, starting a revolt across the South. Brown also brought 1,000 steel pikes, which were forged in Connecticut by a blacksmith and abolitionist sympathizer, Charles Blair; however, the pikes, a weapon that does not require training, were never used as Brown failed to rally the slaves to revolt. The first shot of the raid mortally wounded Heyward Shepherd, a free black man who was a baggage porter for the B&O Railroad.

The noise from that shot alerted Dr. John Starry shortly after 1 am. He walked from his nearby home to investigate the shooting and was confronted by Brown's men. Starry stated that he was a doctor but could do nothing more for Shepherd, and the men allowed him to leave. Starry then went to the livery and rode to neighboring towns and villages, alerting residents to the raid. John Brown's men were quickly pinned down by local citizens and militia, and forced to take refuge in the fire engine house (later called John Brown's Fort), at the entrance to the armory.

The Secretary of War asked the Navy Department for a unit of United States Marines from the Washington Navy Yard, the nearest troops. Lieutenant Israel Greene was ordered to take a force of 86 Marines to the town. U.S. Army Lieutenant Colonel Robert E. Lee was found on leave at his home not far away in Arlington, Virginia, and was assigned as commander, along with Lt. J. E. B. Stuart as his aide-de-camp. Lee led the unit in civilian clothes, as none of his uniforms were available. The contingent arrived by train on October 18, and after negotiations failed, they stormed the fire house and captured most of the raiders, killing a few and suffering a single casualty. Lee submitted a report on October 19.

Brown was quickly tried in Charles Town, county seat of Jefferson County, for treason against the Commonwealth of Virginia, murder, and fomenting a slave insurrection. Convicted of all charges, with Starry's testimony integral to the conviction, he was hanged December 2, 1859. (See Virginia v. John Brown.) John Brown's words, both from his interview by Virginia Governor Henry A. Wise and his famous last speech, "captured the attention of the nation like no other abolitionist or slave owner before or since."

American Civil War

The American Civil War was disastrous for Harpers Ferry, which changed hands eight times between 1861 and 1865. One of the first military actions by secessionists in Virginia was taken on April 18, 1861, when they wrested control of the Federal arsenal at Harpers Ferry from the Union Army, even before the convention which would consider whether or not the state should secede had even been called together.

Because of the town's strategic location on the Baltimore & Ohio Railroad and at the northern end of the Shenandoah Valley, both Union and Confederate troops moved through Harpers Ferry frequently. It was said that "Jefferson County is where the North and South met." It was a natural conduit for Confederate invasions of the North, as in General Robert E. Lee's Maryland campaign of 1862, and his Gettysburg campaign of 1863, and Federal troops heading south in their attempts to thwart Rebel forces in the Valley which threatened Washington, D.C.

The town was "easy to seize, and hard to hold", because of its topography: surrounded on three sides by high ground  – Bolivar Heights to the west, Loudoun Heights to the south, and Maryland Heights to the east – and surrounded by the Potomac and Shenandoah Rivers, anyone who controlled the heights controlled the city.

The effect on the town was devastating. It was described in March 1862:

John G. Rosengarten described it in similar terms, saying that Harpers Ferry and the companion town of Bolivar, in 1859 "a blooming garden-spot, full of thrift and industry and comfort," had been reduced to "waste and desolation" in 1862.

The town's garrison of federal troops attracted 1,500 contrabands (escaped slaves) by the summer of 1862. They were returned to slavery, however, when Confederate General Stonewall Jackson took Harpers Ferry in September 1862, as the town played a key role in the Confederate invasion of Maryland.

Lee needed to control Harpers Ferry because it was on his supply line and could cut off his possible routes of retreat if the invasion did not go well.
 Therefore. Lee divided his army of approximately 40,000 into four sections, sending three columns under Jackson to surround and capture the town.

The Battle of Harpers Ferry started with light fighting September 13 as the Confederates tried to capture the Maryland Heights to the northeast, while John Walker moved back over the Potomac to capture Loudoun Heights south of town. After a Confederate artillery bombardment on September 14 and 15, the federal garrison surrendered. With Jackson's capture of 12,419 federal troops, the surrender at Harpers Ferry was the largest surrender of U.S. military personnel until the Battle of Bataan in World War II.

Because of the delay in capturing the town and the movement of federal forces to the west, Lee was forced to regroup at the town of Sharpsburg. Two days later he commanded troops in the Battle of Antietam, which had the highest number of deaths among troops of any single day in United States military history.

By July 1864, the Union again had control of Harpers Ferry. On July 4, 1864, the Union commanding general, Franz Sigel, withdrew his troops to Maryland Heights, from which he resisted Jubal Anderson Early's attempt to enter the town and drive out the federal garrison.

Post-Civil War
Inspired by John Brown, both runaway and freed slaves came to Harpers Ferry during and after the American Civil War. This created social tensions between white and black residents of the community and generated a growing need for services for the increasing African-American population. Accordingly, a freedman’s school was opened on Camp Hill by Freewill Baptist missionaries following the American Civil War.

Storer College

The town and the armory, except John Brown's Fort, were destroyed during the American Civil War. "The larger portion of the houses all lie in ruins and the whole place is not actually worth $10," wrote a Massachusetts soldier to his mother in 1863. A visitor in 1878 found the town "antiquated, dingy, and rather squalid"; another, in 1879, described it as "shabby and ruined." Since the Arsenal had been Harpers Ferry's largest employer but was never rebuilt, the population never recovered to pre-Civil War levels.

Storer College, devoted to training teachers for freedmen, opened in 1868, much to the displeasure of many residents of Harpers Ferry who petitioned the Legislature to revoke its charter. The War Department gave the Freedmen's Bureau its remaining assets in Harpers Ferry, principally four sturdy residences for the managers of the Armory, structurally sound but in need of repairs from damage during the war, and the Bureau gave them to Storer College. A one-man school for Blacks was already operating in one of them.

African-American tourism

In 1859, Harpers Ferry became a town of great historical importance to African-Americans, where the end of slavery began, as Frederick Douglass put it. With good rail connections to major eastern cities, it became a destination as soon as railroad operations returned to normal after the war. As described in a newspaper in 1873: "One need only to alight from the train and look a little envious toward the old Engine House or the ruined walls of the old Arsenal in order to have a score of persons offering to become a kind of guide or to point out to your whatever you may desire to know about the great struggle which ended in the 'opening of the prison doors, the breaking of every yoke, the undoing of heavy burdens, and letting the oppressed go free.[']"

Storer, the only Black college at a location historically important to African-Americans, became a civil rights center and made the town even more of a destination for Black tourists and excursionists. Frederick Douglass spoke in 1881, as part of an unsuccessful campaign to fund a "John Brown professorship" to be held by an African American. It was at Storer that the Niagara Movement, the predecessor of the NAACP, met for the first time in the United States in 1906 after its earlier organizational meeting in Fort Erie, Ontario, Canada, .

The Baltimore and Ohio Railroad wanted the land where the fort was located so as to make the line less vulnerable to flooding, and some white townspeople were eager to get rid of it; it was dismantled and moved to Chicago for display at the 1893 Columbian Exposition. Abandoned there, it was rescued and moved back to Harpers Ferry by the Baltimore and Ohio without charge, motivated by their expectation that having the fort back in Harpers Ferry would be a tourist attraction and a way to build ridership on the railroad. Most whites were opposed to any commemoration of John Brown, however, and so for lack of a better location it was placed on a nearby farm.

Now Harpers Ferry, easily accessible by rail, began its conversion to its new industry: tourism. Many African-Americans visited Harpers Ferry. There was a Black-owned hotel to accommodate them, the Hill Top House, built and run by a Storer graduate, Thomas Leavitt. In the summer Storer rented rooms to Black vacationers until 1896. The fort was the great monument where the end of slavery began. There were so many tourists that they were a nuisance to the farmer on whose lands the fort sat, and so it was moved to Storer in 1909. There it would remain until several years after the college closed in 1955, functioning as the College Museum. Male students practiced their public speaking skills by giving tours of it.

Visits by tourists, many of them Black, now began to slowly turn the town into a real tourist center. As early as 1878 the Baltimore and Ohio Railroad was running excursion trains to Harpers Ferry from Baltimore and Washington. Tourism was cited as a reason for the town's recovering population growth. "Harpers Ferry proved to be one of the most visited places of leisure for nineteenth-century African Americans."

Island Park Resort and Amusement Park

To increase ridership, the Baltimore & Ohio Railroad built a park in 1879 called Island Park Resort and Amusement Park on Byrne Island in the Potomac, which the railroad bought and built a footbridge to reach it. One had to pay 5¢ ($5 in 2021 value) to cross and enter, after which rides and other activities were free.. It was a site for outings and church picnics, and suitable also for holding political rallies by the railroad as a perk for its employees. (See also Relay, Maryland.) A list of events held there would be long, but as examples there was a reunion of 4,000 Odd Fellows in 1880 and a "Grand Tri-State Democratic Mass Meeting" 1892.

The park was large enough that parades could be held. There were a steam-powered ferris wheel and carousel, a midway, a pavilion for dancing or roller skating, swings, a merry-go-round, and a bandstand. Visitors could also play croquet, tennis, rent boats, fish, or wade in the river. Later there were baseball games. Blacks and whites attended on different days.In 1883, there were an estimated 100,000 visitors. There were six special trains to Harpers Ferry from various points.

For three decades the park operated but was closed in 1909 after many flood repairs. However, the B & O kept the park open even after that for picnicking.

The bandstand, the only surviving structure, has been moved twice. At the park's closing, it was moved to Arsenal Square (the current location of John Brown's Fort), then later to the park at Washington and Gilmore Streets. It is referred to as The Bandstand or the Town Gazebo, and many civic, cultural, and recreational activities take place there.

The bridge was destroyed by flooding in 1896, and a rebuilt bridge in 1924. Remaining structures on the island were destroyed by flooding in 1942.

20th century

2nd Niagara Movement Conference
On August 15, 1906, Black author and scholar W. E. B. Du Bois led the first meeting on American soil of the newly-founded Niagara Movement – so-named because it had initially met in Fort Erie, Ontario, Canada on the Niagara River – on the campus of Storer College, a primarily Black college that operated until 1955. (After it closed, the campus became part of Harpers Ferry National Historical Park.) The three-day gathering, which was held to work for civil rights for African Americans, was later described by DuBois as "one of the greatest meetings that American Negroes ever held" Attendees of the 1906 meeting walked from Storer College to the farm of the Murphy family, the location at the time of John Brown's historic "fort," the armory's firehouse. As a direct result, the fort was soon moved to the Storer campus, where it became the college's central icon. After the college closed in 1955, the National Park Service moved it back to as close as possible to its original location.

Harpers Ferry National Monument and National Historical Park

The combined effects of American Civil War damage and flooding left lower Harpers Ferry in poor condition. The later devastating effects of the 1936 flood left the lower town "shabby and almost uninhabited", with no bridge across the Shenandoah to Virginia and no highway bridge to Maryland. All remaining structures on Virginius Island were destroyed.

The backbone of the effort to preserve and commemorate Harpers Ferry was Henry T. MacDonald, President of Storer, an amateur historian appointed by West Virginia Governor Okey Patteson as head of the Harpers Ferry National Monument Commission. He was assisted by the Representative from West Virginia's Second District, Jennings Randolph, who in 1935 introduced a bill to establish Harpers Ferry National Military Park in "the area where the most important events of [John Brown's raid] took place. Although this bill did not pass, the flood of 1936 made the project more feasible by destroying buildings not historically important ad thus freeing land. After several other attempts, a bill creating Harpers Ferry National Monument was passed and signed by President Roosevelt in 1944, subject to the proviso that nothing would be done with it until the war ended.

An urgent priority was the new highway, which is today U.S. Route 340. A new bridge connecting Sandy Hook, Maryland with Loudoun County, Virginia opened in October 1947, on which work had begun in 1941 but was interrupted by the war. Another new bridge over the Shenandoah connecting Virginia to Bolivar Heights, West Virginia, opened two years later. Federal highway traffic now bypassed Harpers Ferry entirely.

Land acquisition started in lower Harpers Ferry; the project was supported both by Harpers Ferry mayor Gilbert Perry and Governor Patteson. Twenty-two eviction notices were served in the lower town, and two taverns closed.Property acquisition, not all of which was unproblematic, was completed in 1952 and presented to the United States in January 1953. The National Monument's first on-site employee, John T. Willett, began work in 1954.

In 1957 the Baltimore Sun said that the lower town was "a sagging and rotted ghost town." The idea of making Harpers Ferry into a National Monument was to prevent the further deterioration and to rebuild the tourist industry. The first task of the Park Service was to stabilize the buildings on Shenandoah Street, the main commercial street of lower Harpers Ferry. Roofs were covered, missing windows replaced, walls on the verge of collapse reinforced, and debris removed. Post-1859 buildings were not restored, and most were removed. The NPS built a Visitor's Center and a John Brown Museum. Harpers Ferry National Monument became Harpers Ferry National Historical Park on May 29, 1963.

"Recreationists" who wanted a park and did not care about the history were a problem. Local residents did not want to lose recreational opportunities, but swimming and fishing on the Shenandoah shore, formerly common, were prohibited. In order to keep recreationists out of the historic area, and especially Virginius Island, John Brown's Fort was moved to Arsenal Square from a now-inconvenient location on the former Storer College campus, parking in the lower town was prohibited, and a shuttle bus service begun. Tensions between the NPS and town residents were ongoing. However, the NPS helped the town achieve Main Street Status from the National Trust for Historic Preservation in 2001.

The population of Harpers Ferry continued to decline in the 20th century. The majority of the surviving homes in Harpers Ferry are historic. Some are registered in the National Register of Historic Places.

21st century
On July 23, 2015, a fire broke out in downtown Harpers Ferry, destroying eight or nine businesses and two apartments in two historic buildings. The buildings are being rebuilt.

In the early morning of December 21, 2019, multiple cars of a train owned by CSX derailed from the railroad bridge crossing the Potomac River. The derailment damaged a portion of the Goodloe E. Byron Memorial Pedestrian Walkway, which is attached to the railroad bridge and connects the Appalachian Trail between West Virginia and Maryland. Although the accident did not result in any injuries or fatalities, it effectively inhibited all pedestrian access across the Potomac. The bridge reopened in early July 2020.

Hilltop House project
The Hilltop House Hotel, which had opened in 1888 to accommodate African Americans as the sole hotel in Harpers Ferry that would accept them as guests, burned in 1911. It  was rebuilt on a grander scale, but that building also burned in 1919. It was rebuilt a second time on a slightly smaller scale but closed in 2008. As of 2021, developers plan to demolish it and build a new 120-room hotel on the site.

China Folk House Retreat
John Flower, director of the Sidwell Friends School Chinese Studies Program, dismantled a Chinese folk house from Yunnan and rebuilt it in Harpers Ferry with his students. For this project, Flower and his wife Pamela Leonard formed a non-profit organization, the China Folk House Retreat.

Archaeology

Under the auspices of the National Park Service, the archaeology of the town of Harpers Ferry as well as that of Virginius Island have been studied in depth. The journal Historical Archaeology published its entire volume 28, no. 4, issue of 1994 on Harpers Ferry.

Transportation

Roads and highways
The only significant highway providing access to Harpers Ferry is U.S. Route 340. Although signed north-south, the road runs generally eastward from Harpers Ferry across the northern tip of Loudoun County, Virginia after crossing the Shenandoah River, then quickly crosses the Potomac River into Maryland, eventually reaching its terminus at Frederick. To the west, U.S. Route 340 passes through Charles Town before turning southwest and traversing the eastern edge of Virginia's Shenandoah Valley. Harpers Ferry and Bolivar Heights host an unsigned alternate route of U.S. Route 340, which follows Washington Street, High Street, and Shenandoah Street.

Rail

Amtrak provides service to Harpers Ferry two times a day—once in each direction–on the Capitol Limited. It is also served by MARC on the Brunswick Line. The city's passenger rail station is at the West Virginia end of the historic railroad bridge across the Potomac River. In addition about 10–20 CSX freight trains daily pass through Harpers Ferry and over the bridge spanning the Potomac.

Geography
Some properties are currently threatened by development. From most of Harpers Ferry, a fading advertisement for Mennen's Borated Talcum Toilet Powder painted on the cliff face of Maryland Heights decades ago is still visible.

Climate
The climate in this area is characterized by hot, humid summers and generally mild to cool winters, with yearly snowfall averaging 20.7 inches.  According to the Köppen Climate Classification system, Harpers Ferry has a humid subtropical climate, abbreviated "Cfa" on climate maps.

Demographics

2010 census
As of the census of 2010, there were 286 people, 131 households, and 78 families residing in the town. The racial makeup of the town was 94% White, 4% African American, 1% Native American, 0% from other races, and 1% from two or more races. Hispanic or Latino of any race were 1% of the population.

Of the 131 households, 21% had children under the age of 18 living with them; 44% were married couples living together; 13% had a female householder with no husband present; 3% had a male householder with no wife present; and 41% were non-families. Individuals were 29%, with 15% living alone who was 65 years of age or older. The average household size was 2.18 and the average family size, 2.69.

The median age in the town was 52. Of all residents, 17% were under the age of 18; 3% between the ages of 18 and 24; 19% from 25 to 44; 38% from 45 to 64; and 23% 65 years of age or older. The gender makeup of the town was 49.3% male and 50.7% female.

Politics
Federally, Harpers Ferry is part of West Virginia's 2nd congressional district and is represented by Alex Mooney (R) in the United States House of Representatives. Mooney was first elected in 2014.

Notable people
 Nathan Cook Brackett
 John Brown
 John Brown's raiders
 Drusilla Dunjee Houston
 Celeste Brackett Newcomer
 Walton Danforth Stowell
 Col. Edward M. Kirby
 Lewis Washington

See also
 Beall-Air
 Heyward Shepherd monument
 Journey Through Hallowed Ground National Heritage Area
 
 Virginius Island, West Virginia

References
Notes

Further reading
  First published in 1869, as The annals of Harper's Ferry, from the establishment of the national armory in 1794 to the present time

External links

 Corporation of Harpers Ferry Website
 Harpers Ferry During the Civil War in Encyclopedia Virginia
 Harpers Ferry National Historical Park
 Harpers Ferry Historic Town Foundation
 

Harpers Ferry, West Virginia 
1763 establishments in Virginia
African-American historic places
American Civil War sites in West Virginia
Jefferson County, West Virginia in the American Civil War
John Brown's raid on Harpers Ferry
Towns in Jefferson County, West Virginia
Towns in West Virginia
Populated places established in 1763
Washington metropolitan area
West Virginia populated places on the Potomac River